KPAL-LP was a low-power Class A television station in Palmdale, California, broadcasting locally in analog on UHF channel 38 as an Independent station. Founded September 27, 1989, and its studios in Lancaster.

History
On September 27, 1989, the FCC granted an original construction permit to Xenia Renatta Izzo to build a low-power television station to serve Palmdale. The station was to operate on UHF channel 38 and was given callsign K38AW. Izzo licensed the station on October 17, 1990. In October 1992, Izzo agreed to sell the station to Four Pals Community Television Inc., a four-way equal partnership. The FCC approved the deal in May 1993 and the parties finalized a month later. The station took the call letters KPAL-LP in September 1996 and upgraded its license to Class A on July 9, 2001. In December 2003, following the death of one of the members, Four Pals Community Television reorganized as KPAL Television, Inc., a partnership between the three surviving members . In 2005 and 2006, the station received Special Temporary Authorization (STA)to decrease its signal strength from the licensed 4.77 kW. As of November 2006, the station operates at 2.6 kW, but with a broadcast pattern that better serves the community with improved coverage of Lancaster .

Although KPAL had applications pending with the FCC to convert to digital transmission mode, move to channel 22, and transfer ownership to Venture Technologies Group, the station's license was abruptly cancelled by the FCC on July 13, 2012; the STA was terminated and all of the pending applications were dismissed . The station no longer appears in the FCC database.

Programming
KPAL-LP was an independent television station aimed at the local community. Its schedule consisted of news, general entertainment, children's and religious programming. However, paid programming filled much of the broadcast day. The station had been affiliated in the past with defunct networks Network One and UATV, and with America One .

External links

Mass media in Palmdale, California
Television channels and stations established in 1989
Defunct television stations in the United States
Television channels and stations disestablished in 2012
2012 disestablishments in California
1989 establishments in California
PAL-LP
PAL-LP